Qingxi (Mandarin: 青溪镇) is a town in Qingchuan County, Guangyuan, Sichuan, China. In 2010, Qingxi had a total population of 13,984: 7,131 males and 6,853 females: 2,122 aged under 14, 10,455 aged between 15 and 65 and 1,407 aged over 65.

References 
 

 

 
Towns in Sichuan
Qingchuan County